Norape jaramillo is a moth of the Megalopygidae family. It was described by Paul Dognin in 1890.

References

Moths described in 1890
Megalopygidae